Mercha (Hebrew: , also spelled Merkha and other variant English spellings) is a cantillation mark commonly found in the Torah, Haftarah, and other books that are chanted.

Mercha is found in several trope groups, though the melody varies from one use to the next. It is the beginning of the Etnachta group, can be found either once or twice preceding the Sof passuk, or can occasionally precede the Pashta in the Katon group or a Tevir.

Mercha appears in the Torah 9117 times—the second most of any trope sounds. Only Tipcha occurs more often.

The Hebrew word מֵרְכָ֥א translates into English as comma.

Total occurrences

Melody

In Etnachta group

In Sof Passuk group
First appearance (before Tipcha)

Second appearance (after Tipcha)

References

Cantillation marks